Mohammadabad-e Do may refer to:
 Mohammadabad-e Do, Jiroft